Marar may refer to:

 Marar (tribe), a tribe of the United Arab Emirates (UAE)
 Marar (caste), a Hindu Ambalavasi caste in Kerala, India
 Marar, Ramgarh, a town in Jharkhand, India